"Don't Want to Wait Anymore" is a song recorded by the Tubes in 1980. It was the lead single from their fourth studio LP, The Completion Backward Principle. Unlike most of their songs which typically feature Fee Waybill, lead vocals are provided by Bill Spooner, the lead guitar player.

"Don't Want to Wait Anymore" reached the Top 40 in the United States and Australia in the summer of 1981.  It was also a minor hit in the United Kingdom.

Chart history

References

External links
 Lyrics of this song
 

1981 songs
1981 singles
The Tubes songs
Capitol Records singles
Songs written by David Foster
Song recordings produced by David Foster